Gerald Vere Borlase Burgoyne born 1900 and died 4 July 1943. Son of Maj. Gerald Achilles Burgoyne, he married Edith Dorothy Caroline Wilbraham in 1929 and divorced in 1939. One son, Peter Nicholas Wilbraham Burgoyne, survived him.

Vere was the owner of the Spring Lanes Light Railway. He owned many historic miniature locomotives. Vere also built steam locomotives, and had a working relationship with Robert H. Morse.

His livery badge, confirmed to his father is An ostrich plume Azure surmounted by the badge of a Pursuivant of the Most Illustrious Order of the St Patrick Proper and bound by a riband of the first upon it the word "Barra".

References

Model engineers
1943 deaths
1900 births